Hartashen may refer to:
Hartashen, Shirak, Armenia
Hartashen, Syunik, Armenia
Hartashen or Axullu, Nagorno-Karabakh